Licence to Steal is a 1990 Hong Kong action film directed by Billy Chan. It stars Joyce Godenzi, Yuen Biao and Sammo Hung in a cameo role.

Plot
Two sisters who are burglars find themselves at risk when one of them falls in love with the nephew of the police detective assigned to arrest them.

Cast
Joyce Godenzi - Kuang / Hung
Yuen Biao - Swordsman
Agnes Aurelio - Ngan Ping
Richard Ng - Inspector Tam Hsiang Ken
Collin Chou - Yang Chuan Kuang (as Sing Ngai)
Alvina Kong - Hsiao Yen
Billy Chow - Hitman
Chui Jing-Yat - Ngan's sidekick
Corey Yuen - Cop
Peter Chan Lung - Cop
Lau Shun - Uncle Ting
Lam Chung - Police Inspector
Gabriel Wong - Robber
Yeung Jing-Jing - China Tourist
Michael Dinga - Liaison for French Ambassy
Sammo Hung - French Security Guard
Timmy Hung - French Security Guard
Carina Lau
Roger Thomas
Jeff Falcon
Bruce Law

External links
 
 

1990 films
1990 action films
1990s Cantonese-language films
Hong Kong action films
1990s Hong Kong films